Jicham Zaatini (born 17 July 1976) is a former Lebanese tennis player born in Maracay, Venezuela.

Zaatini has a career high ATP singles ranking of 502 achieved on 10 August 1998. He also has a career high ATP doubles ranking of 278 achieved on 14 August 2000. Zaatini represented Lebanon at the Davis Cup, where he has a W/L record of 24–20.

External links

1976 births
Living people
Lebanese male tennis players
Sportspeople from Maracay